Myaree is a suburb of Perth, Western Australia, located within the City of Melville. Myaree gets its name from an Aboriginal word meaning foliage.

Myaree is a predominantly light industrial area. When it was developed, roads were named after soldiers killed in World War I and early settlers in the area.

References

External links

Suburbs of Perth, Western Australia
Suburbs in the City of Melville